Anna Manning Comfort, M.D. ( Manning; January 19, 1845 – January 12, 1931) was an American physician who specialized in women's diseases. She was the first woman medical graduate to practice in the state of Connecticut. Comfort opposed U.S. imperialism. She was one of the pioneer leaders in the cause of woman suffrage, as well as a social reformer who defended the rights of Native Americans and African Americans. A member of Sorosis since 1878, Comfort was also a pioneer clubwoman.

Early life and education
Anna Manning was born in Trenton, New Jersey, January 19, 1845. Her father was Alfred Curling Manning. The first American of the name was Joseph Manning, a brother of James Manning, who was the founder and first president of Brown University. They came to the U.S. from England late in the 17th-century. Comfort's mother was Elizabeth (Price) Manning, who came of a Philadelphia Quaker family. Comfort was of English and French descent.

In her childhood, Comfort's parents removed to Boston, Massachusetts, where she received her academic education. It was there that her father directed her into a special study of the piano, which she continued after the return to New York. At sixteen, she was achieving recognition as an unusual performer. 

An early liking for the studies of anatomy and physiology was discovered by her aunt, Clemence Sophia Harned Lozier, M.D., the founder and for twenty years the dean of the New York Medical College and Hospital for Women. In Lozier’s home, Comfort was finding books that intrigued her curiosity. Soon they absorbed her time and friends began to notice that her music was overstrewn with medical pamphlets. It was the early days of the Civil War (1861–65). The financial world was toppling. There came a time when Mr. Manning told his daughter that his business was in financial trouble. He had decided to move up into New England. Would she go with her family or remain in New York and study medicine in her aunt’s new school. He gave her a week to decide. Lozier, seeing her agony of indecision said to Comfort: “You are just the type and character to make a splendid physician, Anna. Enter the first class, and tell your father that you are going to live with me while you are taking the course."  

At the age of 17, Comfort entered Lozier's office as a student. Lozier's hospitality brought to her house many of the leading reformers of the time, and from discussions with them, Comfort drew much of that sympathetic inspiration and breadth of view which marked her personality in later years. During the Civil War period, Comfort actively pioneered the "Woman’s Rights Movement". 

Comfort was a member of the first class in the New York Medical College for Women. At that time the opposition to women students, which almost amounted to persecution, was manifested in the first class of women students, among other things, by the rude treatment they received from the men students and even from some of the professors while attending the clinics in Bellevue Hospital. Comfort described what she had to endure:— 

In 1865, at the graduating exercises of that class, speeches were made by Henry Ward Beecher, Horace Greeley, Henry Jarvis Raymond, and Hon. S. S. Cox in behalf of enlarging the sphere of woman's activities, and especially on women entering the domain of medicine.

Career

Connecticut
Because her family lived in Norwich, Connecticut, after graduation in 1865, Comfort began the practice of her profession in that city. She was the first woman graduate in medicine to practice in Connecticut. By her strong personality and her professional success, she soon won a large and important patronage in Norwich and eastern Connecticut. But success did not come without difficulties:— 

Comfort was active from 1865 in advocacy of woman suffrage and of the advancement of woman in industrial and professional life and pursuits. In her pioneer practice, she not only appealed and protested but demonstrated and actualized the "woman’s rights movement". She also pioneered in abolition, peace, and dress reform.

New York
In 1870, after developing an enviable practice, succeeded to by her sister, Dr. Emily Manning Smith, Comfort returned to New York City to take up a practice left by the death of a cousin. She was appointed lecturer in the college from which she graduated, and was elected a member of the newly-founded society of Sorosis. At one time, Comfort had seven women members of her family practicing medicine in New York City, besides her sister, Dr. Emily Manning Smith, and her aunt, Dr. Lozier. These were the days of the beginnings of women’s clubs. Sorosis was in its infancy, 1870, when Comfort was elected to membership.

At this time, in New York, she met Prof. George Fisk Comfort, L.H.D., whom she married on January 19, 1871. Prof. Comfort was a scholar in linguistics and art criticism, and was one of the principal founders of the Metropolitan Museum of Art. Soon after, Prof. Comfort was called to Syracuse University as Professor of Modern Languages, History and Aesthetics in that newly-founded institution. It was a crisis for the young wife to leave a large practice; but after some deliberation, in 1872, the removed to Syracuse, New York, and she gave up her career for his, determined to be a great helpmeet and mother. The Comforts had three children and adopted two others: Ralph Manning Comfort, Frederic Price Comfort, Arthur Sterling Comfort, Silas and Grace Comfort. With these family responsibilities and the duties of a prominent professor’s wife, she filled her time.

When the children had grown up, Comfort resumed study to the end of specializing in gynecology, and practiced for nearly thirty years thereafter. The resumption of her medical practice brought many remarks among the university people, among whom she had about an equal number of friends and critics. In the field of gynecology, she achieved success and distinction.

In 1874, Dr. and Prof. Comfort co-authored Women's Education and Women's Health: Chiefly in Reply to "Sex in Education", in which Clarke attacked the higher education of woman. Dr. Comfort lectured on the League of Nations and contributed articles to the Peace Award Contests. She made contributions on medical subjects to the professional journals, as well many figitive writings in prose and poetry to various publications. Since retiring from her active medical practice, Comfort wrote prose, verse, and biographies. 

In 1887 and 1891, she traveled extensively in Europe, where she visited many important hospitals and medical institutions. 

Comfort held memberships in the New York Woman’s Medical Society; Honorary Membership in the Lozier Medical Club; and 55 years of membership in Sorosis.

Death and legacy
In 1916, an endowed scholarship at the New York Medical College and Hospital for Women was named in Comfort's honor.

Anna Manning Comfort died of pneumonia, in New York, January 12, 1931.

Selected works
 Women's Education and Women's Health: Chiefly in Reply to "Sex in Education", with George Fisk Comfort (Syracuse: T.W. Dunston, 1874)

References

External links
 
 

1845 births
1931 deaths
Wikipedia articles incorporating text from A Woman of the Century
19th-century American physicians
20th-century American physicians
19th-century American women physicians
20th-century American women physicians
People from Trenton, New Jersey
New York Medical College alumni
American gynecologists
American suffragists
Clubwomen
American social reformers
Deaths from pneumonia in New York (state)
Physicians from New York City